Thomas Kinnicut Beecher (February 10, 1824 - March 14, 1900) was a Congregationalist preacher and the principal of several schools. As a Congregational minister, his father took the family from Beecher's birthplace of Litchfield, Connecticut, to Boston, Massachusetts, and Cincinnati, Ohio, by 1832.

After college and some teaching experience, Beecher later settled in Elmira, New York, where he was minister of a Congregational church. His services became popular and he presided over construction at a new church to accommodate the large congregation. Beecher became a close friend of writer Sam Clemens (Mark Twain) and presided at Clemens' marriage to Olivia Langdon. A memorial statue was erected to him in Elmira, where he worked and lived most of his life.

Early life and education
Thomas K. Beecher was born in Litchfield, Connecticut to Lyman Beecher and his wife Harriet Porter. His father was a minister in the Congregational Church and the family was raised as observing Christians. Thomas Beecher was one of thirteen children, including Henry Ward (who became a noted minister and abolitionist activist), William, Catherine, Edward, Mary, George, Harriet (later known as an anti-slavery activist and author of Uncle Tom's Cabin), Charles, Isabella, and James Beecher.
Following Lyman Beecher, their father, Thomas' brother Henry Ward and later Thomas also became ministers.

In 1826 the family moved to Boston, Massachusetts. Several years later, their father was called to another church and they moved to Cincinnati, Ohio in 1832.

From 1836 to 1839 Beecher went to preparatory school in Marietta, Ohio. In 1839 he attended college in Jacksonville, Illinois; he graduated in 1843. He spent a year with his father in Cincinnati and a year with his brother and minister, Henry Ward Beecher, in Indianapolis, studying theology. Beecher worked for a year at the Ohio Medical University, as an aid to the professor of chemistry and pharmacy.

Work as a teacher
Beecher worked formally in several educational institutions. In 1846 he became the principal of the North-East Grammar School in Philadelphia. From 1848 to 1851, he was the head of the High School in Hartford, Connecticut.

Beecher married Olivia Day in 1851; she died two years later.

Thomas Beecher was ordained at age 28, and he began his preaching career in Brooklyn, in the area of Williamsburg. His brother Henry Ward Beecher had a congregation in Brooklyn.

Home on Watercure Hill
Beecher moved to Elmira, New York, in 1854 and took residence at the Gleason Sanitarium on Watercure Hill. This was an area of sanitariums established for treatment of tuberculosis (TB), which had no known cure. A combination of rest and good, cold, dry air was considered beneficial. In 1857 a cottage was built for him near the Sanitarium. It was a Victorian home with its own library; it had an artesian well in the basement, where Beecher would take plunge baths.

Professional life
After teaching in public schools in other places, in 1854 Beecher moved to Elmira, New York, to preach at a local Congregational church. There he became a close friend to the famous author Samuel Clemens ("Mark Twain").

In 1857 Beecher married his second wife, Julia Jones. She was his deceased wife's cousin, and granddaughter of Noah Webster, author of Webster's Dictionary.

Civil War
"When war broke out, Thomas Beecher worked indefatigably on behalf of the Union cause. He delivered numerous sermons denouncing secession and defending the Union.He also travelled throughout upstate New York to recruit badly needed troops for New York regiments. ...Beecher's joining the 141st New York Regiment in September of 1862—he was mustered in as chaplain on 12 September 1862
and discharged on 10 January 1863—was the culmination of his efforts on behalf of the Union cause."

In 1863 to aid the cause of the Union in the Civil War, which had been underway for two years, Beecher started a regiment with A.S. Diven (the Army depended on wealthier private individuals to recruit men and outfit them with arms, horses, and uniforms), the 107th regiment, which was soon sent to the front. Later, Beecher aided Colonel Hathaway in raising the 141st regiment and would go into the field with them as a chaplain, serving into 1864.

Return to civilian life
He sailed to South America due to depleted health in November 1866. He returned 1 May 1867, feeling rejuvenated. Beecher was intimately involved with both teaching and preaching, as was typical of clergy. He also participated in a range of sports when his health was good enough: Baseball, target shooting, battledore (similar to badminton), cycling, cricket, and croquet. Beecher also enjoyed indoor games of euchre and billiards.

In 1870, along with the Rev. Joseph Twichell, he officiated over the marriage of Samuel Clemens ("Mark Twain") to Olivia Langdon.

Ministry
In 1854 Beecher went to the town of Elmira, New York to preach at the Independent Congregational Church. When his services became overcrowded, Beecher held the service at the newly constructed opera house and, weather permitting, at Eldridge Park.

When Beecher arrived, the church was a moderate-sized wooden structure. Now known as Park Church, it is located on the west side of Wisner Park on North Main Street in Elmira. The growing congregation overwhelmed it. After one of his popular services, he asked the congregation if they felt a new church was necessary. Estimates were that a suitable one would cost  fifty thousand dollars. The vote was almost unanimous in favor of a new church, and total pledges of about eighty thousand dollars were given toward that goal.

To support its community, the new church also had a facility for social gatherings and events such as banquets and parties, as well a large hall where the children could play. Beecher started a public library at the church, donating his personal collection. The church held two services; one in the morning, the other in the evening. (Beecher also ministered to the prisoners of the Elmira Prison Camp).

Later in life two services conducting two services was too taxing on Beecher's health, and he cancelled the evening service. To provide another forum, Beecher founded a club of male youths, who would meet on Tuesday nights. Beecher would ask them to report on something interesting they observed during the previous week. He also sent his pupils to mechanics, locomotive shops and other places, in order to learn through observation.

During his preaching career in Elmira, Beecher was the head of the Sunday school run by the Park Church. It had about 700 members, ranging in age from five to past fifty. Different classes were led by volunteers.

Death and legacy
Thomas K. Beecher died 14 March 1900, aged 76 years. At his funeral service both a priest and a rabbi spoke. His wife Julia survived him.

 A statue in Beecher's honor was erected at Wisner Park. 
 T.K. Beecher Elementary School, located in Elmira, was named in his honor.

See also 
 New England Congregational Church and Rectory
 Beecher family

Notes

References
 Jim Peebles, pastor “Beecher Stories”, Elmira, NY
 “True to History”, Twin Tiers homes, The Star Gazette, January 27
 Barbara Cunningham, “The Past Lives”, The Star Gazette
 The Elmira Gazette, 1873, volume 1 issue 6
 W.S.B. Mathews, “A Remarkable Personality” (essay)
 Dorothy Holt, 1951, “Elmira’s First Citizen”
 Arthur Booth, “Thomas K. Beecher and some personal recollections”
 “Recollections of Mr. Beecher”, by a former member of the Tuesday night club

External links
 

1824 births
1900 deaths
People from Litchfield, Connecticut
American Congregationalist ministers
19th-century American clergy